Alexis Ffrench (born 1970) is a British classical - soul pioneer, musician, composer, producer, and pianist. Ffrench’s remarkable music has amassed more than half a billion streams and both albums ‘Evolution’ and ‘Dreamland’ reached No. 1 in the Classical Music Charts. Ffrench has headlined London’s iconic Royal Albert Hall, collaborated with top fashion houses Miyake and Hugo Boss, played Latitude Festival, worked with pop superstar Paloma Faith, composed several major film scores and shares the same management team as Little Mix & Niall Horan. A passionate advocate for music education, Ffrench is a Governing Body Member and Trustee of the Royal Academy of Music, London, and is the first Artistic Director of the Royal Schools of Music in its 132 year history. An experienced broadcaster, Ffrench is the host of Classical Connections on Apple Music 1.

Career 
Ffrench has been improvising on the piano since the age of four. He received scholarships to study at The Purcell School for Young Musicians, the Royal Academy of Music and the Guildhall School of Music and Drama. He is known for his unusual style of combining his classical training with a love of roots music and R&B.

He is signed to Sony Music and Modest! Management. In 2017, he released his singles "Bluebird", "Radiate" and a cover of "Have Yourself A Merry Little Christmas".

Ffrench delivers educational programmes on writing and producing music to young people, and has partnered with The Prince’s Trust, MJ Cole, Marvin Humes and other special guests.

In 2019, Ffrench joined Scala Radio as a presenter.

In March 2021 he became Scala Radio's composer in residence.

In 2022, Ffrench released his new album Truth, also releasing the single "One Look", featuring Leona Lewis.

Influences
Before his formal music education, at the age of 7 Ffrench was appointed head organist at his local church in Surrey, becoming the UK's youngest church organist. Growing up in a household full of the music of Stevie Wonder, Bob Marley and Ella Fitzgerald, Ffrench first honed his craft by playing the kitchen table aged four and writing his first pieces at five, his prodigious gifts convincing his parents to buy a second-hand piano.

A tragic turning point came at 23, when Ffrench's best friend, a fellow musician, died by suicide. It led Ffrench both to reassess his music and to become keenly aware of the importance of good mental health. Dreamland’s vision of a safe haven is drawn from Ffrench's awareness of mental health concerns.

Ffrench points to the hip-hop community’s success in getting across its own complex musical messages to the mainstream. He cites the challenging music of Kendrick Lamar and Anderson .Paak as examples of superstars doing it their own way. "Kendrick Lamar's song "Humble" is like Béla Bartók's Out Of Doors suite, in the pugilistic bass notes in the extremities of the piano at the opening of both works. I think to attract a contemporary audience, classical can learn from how hip-hop has marketed its music and ideas." The mix of Kendrick Lamar and Bartok, Shostakovich and Ariana Grande is present throughout Alexis’ weekly Sunday show on Scala Radio, a broad church where Alexis highlights the song craft in pop and revels in classical majesty. Praised by The Times as "If a single person epitomises the new push towards making classical music more diverse, eclectic and unstuffy, it's Alexis Ffrench. As a pianist and composer, he creates tonal music that beguiles newcomers with its gentleness and beauty, yet also has enough half-concealed nods to Chopin, Debussy, Satie and other historical figures to keep connoisseurs interested."

His 2020 single "Walk With Us" pays homage to the Black Lives Matter movement, with 100% of label net proceeds and artist record royalties donated to the cause.

Discography

Albums

Film scores

References

External links 
Official site
Website at Sony Classical
Alexis Ffrench Youtube
Alexis Ffrench Instagram
Alexis Ffrench TikTok
Sony Classical Youtube
Sony Classical Instagram
Sony Classical TikTok
Alexis Ffrench on Scala Radio

1970 births
Living people
British classical pianists
British classical composers
21st-century British pianists